Unión Militar Española (Spanish Military Union) was a pro-fascist secret society of officers of the Spanish Republican Armed Forces involved in a conspiracy to bring about the restoration of the monarchy during the 1930s. The majority of members of this organization became part of the nationalist forces during the Spanish Civil War.

Formation
This clandestine group was founded in late 1933 by Colonel  and soon linked up with the conspiracies of Juan Antonio Ansaldo. Tarduchy, who had been a partisan for the Miguel Primo de Rivera regime, was seen as too sectarian and soon replaced by Captain Bartolomé Barba Hernández. The executive council, apart from Barba Hernández, consisted of 6 other members: Emilio Rodríguez Tarduchy, Ricardo Rada Peral, Valentín Galarza Morante, Luis Arredondo Acuña, Rafael Sánchez Sacristán and Gumersindo de la Gándara Morella. The group soon established cells within many garrisons, although its influence was somewhat limited as it only really attracted younger, lower-ranked officers.

Conspiracies
It was late summer 1935 before Francisco Franco made direct contact with the group through his ally and UME member Valentín Galarza Morante. Franco would later claim that the main reason for the contact was so as he could ensure that the officers did not launch a premature coup themselves. In January 1936 the conspiring members of the UME held meetings along the conspiring group of the military led originally by Manuel Goded, of which Joaquín Fanjul and Ángel Rodríguez del Barrio were also representatives. However the conspiring plot around Emilio Mola took over both two initiatives, and by early 1936 the UME had placed itself at the disposal of the later and was a full participant in the nationalist coup plans. Its membership was now estimated at almost half of all serving officers and included many who held dual membership with the Falange.

Involvement in the Civil War
The group was closely associated with fascism and maintained a black list of leading republican officers and in the build-up to the war the top two names, Carlos Faraudo and José del Castillo, were both killed. The murders, and the reprisal killing of José Calvo Sotelo, were instrumental in bringing about the war itself.

See also
1930 in Spain
Secret society

References

Bibliography 
 

Monarchist organizations
Spanish Army
Organisations of the Spanish Civil War
Monarchism in Spain
Fascism in Spain
1933 establishments in Spain
Organizations established in 1933
Secret societies in Spain